Tachystola is a genus of the concealer moth family (Oecophoridae), in the Oecophorinae subfamily. It is an Australasian genus of fourteen species with one found in Europe, which is presumably an introduction.

Species
Species include:
 Tachystola ptochodes (Turner 1917)
 Tachystola acroxantha (Meyrick 1885)
 Tachystola insinuata  Meyrick 1914
 Tachystola proxena  Meyrick 1914
 Tachystola hemisema Meyrick 1885
 Tachystola thiasotis Meyrick 1885
 Tachystola pyrsopa Meyrick 1921
 Tachystola oxytora (Meyrick 1885)
 Tachystola anthera (Meyrick 1885)
 Tachystola cerochyta Turner 1940
 Tachystola phaeopyra (Turner 1927)
 Tachystola sidon (Meyrick 1913)
 Tachystola homoleuca Meyrick 1885
 Tachystola enoplia (Meyrick 1885)

References

Oecophorinae
Taxa named by Edward Meyrick